Bobby Wyatt (born August 1, 1992) is an American professional golfer. He had a successful amateur career, playing in the 2013 Walker Cup.

Youth career
Wyatt attended UMS-Wright Preparatory School, graduating in 2010. He shot a 57 at the Alabama Boys State Junior Championship. He was a four-time AHSAA state champion.

College career
He was part of the University of Alabama team that won the 2013 and 2014 NCAA Division I Championship. He won the Southeastern Conference individual championship in 2014.  Wyatt was an All-American his senior year.

Amateur career
He won the 2012 Sunnehanna Amateur.

Wyatt was the leading scorer and went undefeated at the 2013 Walker Cup for the United States.

Professional career
Wyatt finished 4th in the 2016 Zurich Classic of New Orleans, playing on a sponsor exemption. This finish earned him enough non-member FedEx Cup points to qualify for the Web.com Tour Finals. He earned a PGA Tour card for 2017 by finishing 22nd on the Finals money list (excluding the 25 regular-season graduates).

Amateur wins
2009 Junior Players Championship
2010 HP Boys at Carlton Woods, Alabama State Junior
2012 Sunnehanna Amateur
2014 SEC Championship

Source:

U.S. national team appearances
Amateur
Palmer Cup: 2013
Walker Cup: 2013 (winners)

See also
2016 Web.com Tour Finals graduates

References

External links

American male golfers
Alabama Crimson Tide men's golfers
PGA Tour golfers
Korn Ferry Tour graduates
Golfers from Alabama
Sportspeople from Mobile, Alabama
1992 births
Living people